Shani Wallis (born 14 April 1933) is a British actress and singer, who has worked in theatre, film, and television in both her native United Kingdom and in the United States. A graduate of the Royal Academy of Dramatic Art, she is known for her roles in the West End and for the role of Nancy in the 1968 Oscar-winning film musical Oliver!

Biography
Wallis was born 14 April 1933 in Tottenham, London, and made her first stage appearance at the age of four. She later studied at the Royal Academy of Dramatic Art.

She made her theatrical debut in a lead role as young princess Maria in Call Me Madam at the London Coliseum in March 1952. Wallis sprang to global fame when appearing as Nancy in the Oscar-winning musical film Oliver! in 1968, starring alongside Oliver Reed as Bill Sykes, Ron Moody as Fagin, Jack Wild as the Artful Dodger, and Mark Lester as Oliver. Afterwards, Wallis received an offer to star in the television series The Brady Bunch, but turned it down because she wanted to do more musicals.

Wallis is a naturalised citizen of the United States, where she has lived for more than 40 years. She married her agent, Bernie Rich, on 13 September 1968; the couple have one daughter and two granddaughters. Wallis is a patron of the theatre charity The Music Hall Guild of Great Britain and America.

Selected credits

Film

 Ramsbottom Rides Again (1956)
 The Extra Day (1956)
A King in New York (1957) as Cabaret Singer
 Oliver! (1968) as Nancy
 Arnold (1973) 
 Terror in the Wax Museum (1973) 
 Mayday at 40,000 Feet (1976)
 The Great Mouse Detective (voice of Lady Mouse, 1986)
 Round Numbers (1992)
 The Pebble and the Penguin (narrator, 1995)
 Mojave Phone Booth (voice of "Greta", 2006)

Selected TV

 Two of a Kind (with Morecambe and Wise, 1961)
 The Garry Moore Show (1963-1964)
  Once Upon a Mattress (as Lady Larken, with most of the original Broadway cast, 1964)
 The Dean Martin Show (singing "I'm a Girl" and "How Are Things in Glocca Morra?", 1965)
 The Red Skelton Hour (1965 episode singing "I'm Old Fashioned" and singing/dancing "Pass Me By")
 This Is Tom Jones (1969, 1970)
 Gunsmoke (as Stella in the episodes "Women for Sale", 1973)
 The Young and the Restless (as Frances the Governess, 2004)
 The $10,000 Pyramid
 Charlie's Angels (guest appearance as Ellen Jason, 1977)
 Columbo (as Gwen, in the "Strange Bedfellows" episode, 1995)
 Murder, She Wrote (guest appearance as Olivia Waverley, 1989)
 Night Gallery (as Miss Danton - segment "The Doll", 1971)
 Mickie Finn's (as herself, 1966)
 The Ed Sullivan Show (where she was spotted and subsequently auditioned and won the part of Nancy in the 1968 film Oliver)

Theatre

 Call Me Madam, (1952), London Coliseum (as Princess Marie)
 Wish You Were Here, (1953), London Casino 
 Happy As a King, (1953), Princes Theatre, London (as Juliet) 
 Wonderful Town (1954), London Casino (as Fay Tomkin) 
 Irma La Douce (1961), Lyric Theatre (title role)
 Fine Fettle (1959), Palace Theatre
 Green Room Rags (1954), Princes Theatre
 The Dave King Show, (1956), London Hippodrome
 Aladdin, (pantomime), (1955), Streatham Hill Theatre (as Aladdin)
 King Cole (pantomime, 1962), Palace Manchester (as Miranda)
 Bells Are Ringing (1958), Princess Theatre, Melbourne
 Bus Stop (1958), Golders Green Hippodrome (as Cherie)
 You'll Be Lucky, (1954), Adelphi Theatre with Lauri Lupino Lane
 Cowardy Custard (1989), Theatre Royal Bath
 A Time for Singing (1966), Broadway Theater
 Finian's Rainbow (1958), New Shakespeare Theatre
 42nd Street, (1985), Drury Lane Theatre
 Follies (1990), Long Beach Civic Light Opera, 20th Anniversary Revival (as Sally Durant Plummer) 
 Always (1997), Victoria Palace Theatre

Recordings
 Call Me Madam – original London stage recording (1952)
 Wish You Were Here – original London stage recording (1953)
 Shani! EP (1960) – Philips BBE 12337 ("Personality", "Please Don't Say No", "Don't Take Your Love Away from Me", "There Goes My Heart")
 A Time for Singing (1966) – original Broadway cast recording
 I'm a Girl! LP (1967) – Kapp Records KS-3472
 Look to Love LP (1967) – Kapp Records KS-3527
 Oliver! (1968) – original film cast recording
 As Long As He Needs Me LP (1968) – Kapp Records KS-3573
 The Girl from Oliver LP (1969) – Kapp Records KS-3606

References

External links

1933 births
Living people
American film actresses
American stage actresses
American television actresses
American women singers
American musical theatre actresses
American voice actresses
Audiobook narrators
English film actresses
English television actresses
English women singers
English emigrants to the United States
English musical theatre actresses
English voice actresses
English stage actresses
People from Tottenham
Alumni of RADA
Kapp Records artists
21st-century American women